Mercedita is a common forename derived from Mercedes. It may refer to:

 Mercedita International Airport, an international commercial airport in Ponce, Puerto Rico
 Hacienda Mercedita, a now defunct sugar mill and refinery plantation in Ponce, Puerto Rico
 , a wooden steamer that served in the United States Navy during the American Civil War.

See also
 Merceditas Gutierrez, Philippine government official